Lake Iatt is a cypress-covered lake located in Grant Parish, Louisiana, United States.  The lake is known for its largemouth bass, crappie and bream fishing. Many duck hunters also enjoy the fair population of migratory birds who pass through. There are several public boat launches for accessing the lake. It is 6580 acres.

References

Bodies of water of Grant Parish, Louisiana
Lakes of Louisiana